Arved Fuchs (born 26 April 1953) is a German polar explorer and writer.

Polar exploration 

On 30 December 1989, Fuchs and Reinhold Messner were the first to reach the South Pole with neither animal nor motorised help, using skis and a parasail. That made him the first person to reach both poles by foot within one year.

Many of his expeditions have taken place on water, such as his failed attempt to sail around North Pole on a traditional sailing boat (1991–1994). This boat, Dagmar Aaen, is still used by Fuchs on his current expeditions.

In 2000, Fuchs led an expedition to recreate Ernest Shackleton's desperate sea journey in the James Caird from Elephant Island to South Georgia, and the subsequent land crossing of that island.

Recognition 
In October 2017, Fuchs was awarded the Order of Merit of the Federal Republic of Germany for his merits to the protection of the environment.

Publications

References

External links 
 

1953 births
Explorers of Antarctica
German explorers
Living people
People from Bad Bramstedt
Recipients of the Cross of the Order of Merit of the Federal Republic of Germany
South Pole